The Hawaiian Music Hall of Fame  is an organization dedicated to recognizing the cultural importance of the music of Hawaii and hula. Established in 1994, the Hawaiian Music Hall of Fame promotes the appreciation and preservation of Hawaiian culture through educational programs and annual inductions honoring significant individuals, groups, institutions, chanters and songs.

The Royal Patrons
King David Kalakaua, Queen Liliuokalani, Princess Miriam Likelike and Prince William Pitt Leleiohoku II were siblings known as Na Lani ʻEhā, or The Royal Four, for their patronage and enrichment of Hawaii's musical culture and history. All four were composers. Their aggregate body of musical compositions in the Hawaiian language numbers in the hundreds. After the hula had long been banned by missionaries, Kalakaua restored it as a symbol of the Hawaiian culture. Kalakaua and Liliuokalani were the last monarchs of the Kingdom of Hawaii, but The Royal Four's legacy of music to Hawaii lives on through individual artists. The Hawaiian Music Hall of Fame acknowledges the royal siblings as their patrons.

Meles & Songbooks

Institutions

Musical groups

Chanters
Relevant historical events coinciding with the time frame of the chanter prophesies:

1778–1779, Captain James Cook and crew become the first Europeans to visit Hawaii. They infect the Hawaiian women with syphilis.
1809 Henry Opukahaia of Hawaii arrives in New Haven, Connecticut and begins Christian studies.
1810 Kamehameha I succeeds in unification of the Kingdom of Hawaii.
1819 Kamehameha II assumes the throne upon the death of his father, breaks the kapu by eating at the table with the women, orders destruction of the heiau worship sites of the old religion.
1820 Hiram Bingham I arrives in Hawaii with the first wave of Christian missionaries.
1824–1849 Epidemics of measles, mumps and whooping cough kill tens of thousands of Hawaiians.

Individuals

See also
Na Hoku Hanohano Awards
Hawai'i Academy of Recording Arts 
Music of Hawaii

References

External links
 Hawaiian Music Hall of Fame Honorees

Hawaiian
Hawaiian Music Hall Fame
Hawaiian Music Hall Fame
Hawaiian Music
Halls of fame in Hawaii